Blood Money is the fifteenth studio album by Tom Waits, released in 2002 on the ANTI- label.

The album contains songs written for the musical Woyzeck, based on the play of the same name by Georg Büchner. The theatrical adaptation was directed by Robert Wilson, with whom Waits had worked on two previous plays: The Black Rider and Alice, both of which resulted in albums. The latter was released simultaneously in 2002 with Blood Money. The play premiered at the Betty Nansen Theatre in Copenhagen in November 2000.

The song "God's Away on Business" was featured in the 2005 film Enron: The Smartest Guys in the Room. "All the World is Green" was featured in the 2005 film The Secret Life of Words. "Misery is the River of the World" was featured in The X-Files episode "Babylon", which aired on February 16, 2016. "Starving in the Belly of a Whale" was featured in the film Buster's Mal Heart (2016) as the opening song.

The album ranked at #18 in Metacritic's Top 30 albums of 2002.

As of 2003, Blood Money has sold 143,000 copies in the US, according to Nielsen Soundscan.

Track listing
All tracks written by Tom Waits and Kathleen Brennan.

 "Misery Is the River of the World" – 4:25
 "Everything Goes to Hell" – 3:45
 "Coney Island Baby" – 4:02
 "All the World Is Green" – 4:36
 "God's Away on Business" – 2:59
 "Another Man's Vine" – 2:28
 "Knife Chase" – 2:26 (Instrumental)
 "Lullaby" – 2:09
 "Starving in the Belly of a Whale" – 3:41
 "The Part You Throw Away" – 4:22
 "Woe" – 1:20
 "Calliope" – 1:59 (Instrumental)
 "A Good Man Is Hard to Find" – 3:57

Charts

Weekly charts

Year-end charts

Certifications

References

Tom Waits albums
Tom Waits soundtracks
Anti- (record label) soundtracks
2002 albums
Anti- (record label) albums
Works based on Woyzeck